Lake Mullucocha (possibly from Quechua mullu small pearl made of fine clay / marine shell which is offered to the divinities, qucha lake, lagoon) is a lake in Peru located in the Lima Region, Yauyos Province, Tanta District.

Lake Mullucocha is situated next to an ancient road part of the Inca road system.

See also
 List of lakes in Peru
 Nor Yauyos-Cochas Landscape Reserve
 Pirqa Pirqa

References

Lakes of Peru
Lakes of Lima Region